Dehra is a village in near Dhaulana, Uttar Pradesh, India. It is located in the Hapur district, about  60 km East of Delhi via NH-24.

References 

Villages in Hapur district